The 2022 New Hampshire gubernatorial election was held on November 8, 2022, to elect the governor of New Hampshire. As New Hampshire does not have gubernatorial term limits, incumbent Republican Governor Chris Sununu won re-election to a fourth 2-year term in office against Democratic nominee Tom Sherman with 57 percent of the vote, a reduced margin from his 65 percent landslide win in 2020.

Sununu had 'expressed interest' in running for the U.S. Senate in 2022 against incumbent Democrat (and former governor) Maggie Hassan. However, on November 9, 2021, he announced that he would instead run for a fourth term as governor. Sununu became the first Republican to win a fourth term as governor, and also tying John Lynch's modern record of four terms overall.

Republican primary

Candidates

Nominee
Chris Sununu, incumbent governor

Eliminated in primary
Julian Acciard, security specialist, Iraq War veteran, and former candidate for New Hampshire's 1st Congressional district in 2022
Jay Lewis, Laconia resident
Richard McMenamon II
Thad Riley, entrepreneur, former Brentwood school board member and community advocate
Karen Testerman, former Franklin city councilor and candidate for governor in 2020

Declined
Kelly Ayotte, former U.S. Senator
Scott Brown, former U.S. Senator from Massachusetts and nominee for U.S. Senate in 2014

Endorsements

Polling

Results

Democratic primary

Candidates

Nominee
Tom Sherman, state senator from the 24th district

Declined
Dan Feltes, former majority leader of the New Hampshire Senate from the 15th district and nominee for governor in 2020 (Moved out of state in 2021)
John Lynch, former governor
Jodi Picoult, author
Andru Volinsky, former Executive Councilor and candidate for governor in 2020
Cinde Warmington, Executive Councilor (running for re-election)

Endorsements

Results

Other candidates

Libertarian Party

Nominees
Karlyn Borysenko, activist and author
Kelly Halldorson

General election

Predictions

Endorsements

Polling
Aggregate polls

Graphical summary

Chris Sununu vs. generic opponent

Results

Results by county

See also
 Elections in New Hampshire
 Political party strength in New Hampshire
 New Hampshire Democratic Party
 New Hampshire Republican Party
 Government of New Hampshire
2022 United States Senate election in New Hampshire
 2022 United States House of Representatives elections in New Hampshire
2022 New Hampshire House of Representatives election
 2022 New Hampshire Senate election
 2022 New Hampshire elections
2022 United States gubernatorial elections
 2022 United States elections

Notes 

Partisan clients

References

External links 
Official campaign websites
 Karlyn Borysenko (L) for Governor
 Tom Sherman (D) for Governor
 Chris Sununu (R) for Governor

New Hampshire gubernatorial elections
Gubernatorial
New Hampshire